De Allergrootste Slijmfilm is a 2022 Dutch film directed by Martijn Smits. The film won the Golden Film award after having sold 100,000 tickets. It was the fifth best visited Dutch film of 2022 with just over 215,000 visitors. The film is the sequel to the 2021 film De Nog Grotere Slijmfilm, which is also directed by Martijn Smits.

The film was announced in February 2022.

References

External links 
 

2022 films
Dutch adventure films
Dutch children's films
2020s Dutch-language films
Films directed by Martijn Smits
Dutch sequel films
Films shot in the Netherlands